Ezekiel 31 is the thirty-first chapter of the Book of Ezekiel in the Hebrew Bible or the Old Testament of the Christian Bible. This book contains the prophecies attributed to the prophet/priest Ezekiel, and is one of the Books of the Prophets. In the New King James Version, this chapter is sub-titled "Egypt Cut Down Like a Great Tree".

Text
The original text was written in the Hebrew language. This chapter is divided into 18 verses.

Textual witnesses
Some early manuscripts containing the text of this chapter in Hebrew are of the Masoretic Text tradition, which includes the Codex Cairensis (895), the Petersburg Codex of the Prophets (916), Aleppo Codex (10th century), Codex Leningradensis (1008).

There is also a translation into Koine Greek known as the Septuagint, made in the last few centuries BC. Extant ancient manuscripts of the Septuagint version include Codex Vaticanus (B; B; 4th century), Codex Alexandrinus (A; A; 5th century) and Codex Marchalianus (Q; Q; 6th century).

Verse 1
 Now it came to pass in the eleventh year, in the third month, on the first day of the month, that the word of the Lord came to me, saying,

Verse 2
 "Son of man, say to Pharaoh king of Egypt and to his multitude:
 ‘Whom are you like in your greatness?’"
 "Son of man" (Hebrew: בן־אדם -): this phrase is used 93 times to address Ezekiel. 
 "Pharaoh" (Hebrew: פרעה ; Egyptian: pr-±o, "great house"; Greek: Φαραω, Pharao): the title of ancient Egyptian kings, of royal court, and (in new kingdom) of the king, until the Persian invasion.

Verse 3
 Indeed Assyria was a cedar in Lebanon,
 With fine branches that shaded the forest,
 And of high stature;
 And its top was among the thick boughs.
Assyria was a superpower which fell into the hand of the Babylonians (see ). In the New Living Translation, Assyria "was once like a cedar of Lebanon", making it clear that the reference to Lebanon is a metaphor, not a locational statement. and that Assyria's influence in the region had now waned.

Ezekiel anticipates that soon Egypt will fall likewise.

Verse 8
The cedars in the garden of God could not hide it;
The fir trees were not like its boughs,
And the chestnut trees were not like its branches;
No tree in the garden of God was like it in beauty.
The "garden of God" is the garden of Eden.

See also

Related Bible parts: Ezekiel 29, Ezekiel 30, Nahum 3

Notes

References

Bibliography

External links

Jewish
Ezekiel 31 Hebrew with Parallel English
Ezekiel 31 Hebrew with Rashi's Commentary

Christian
Ezekiel 31 English Translation with Parallel Latin Vulgate

31